94 Squadron or 94th Squadron may refer to:

 No. 94 Squadron RAF, a unit of the British Royal Air Force 
 No. 94 Squadron RAAF, a unit of the Royal Australian Air Force 
 94th Fighter Squadron (United States), a unit of the United States Air Force 
 VFA-94 (Strike Fighter Squadron 94), a unit of the United States Navy